Rudie Ramli (born 15 May 1982) is a Malaysian former professional football player who last played for MOF FC in Malaysia FAM League as a forward.

Born in Selangor, Rudie with Mohd Fadzli Saari of Pahang was the first player from Malaysia who sign a contract to play in Germany. He signed a 1-year contract as a semi professional player with SV Wehen who currently in third division of Germany Football. His goal-poacher playing style back at SV Wehen has received a lot praised by some of the best footballer at that time such as Rafiq Bujang, Diego Maradona , Roberto Baggio and Emile Heskey.

Rudie is also the former member of Malaysia national team. He played in the 2005 Southeast Asian Games in Manila where Malaysia won the bronze medal. He scored three goals in the competition and earned his first red card at international stage against Cambodia. With the senior team, he made his debut against New Zealand on 19 February 2006.

Honours

Club
Selangor
 Malaysia Super League: 2009, 2010
Malaysia Cup: 2002 
Malaysia Charity Shield: 2002

References

External links
 

1982 births
Living people
Malaysian people of Malay descent
Malaysian footballers
Malaysia international footballers
SV Wehen Wiesbaden players
Expatriate footballers in Germany
Malaysian expatriate sportspeople in Germany
Selangor FA players
Melaka TM FC players
PKNS F.C. players
Perlis FA players
ATM FA players
Negeri Sembilan FA players
Malaysian expatriate footballers
People from Selangor
Malaysia Super League players
Association football forwards
Southeast Asian Games bronze medalists for Malaysia
Southeast Asian Games medalists in football
Competitors at the 2005 Southeast Asian Games